Prien am Chiemsee (official: , High German [], Bavarian (local) dialect []) is a municipality in the Upper Bavarian district of Rosenheim in Germany. The town is a certified air and Kneipp spa on the western shore of the lake of Chiemsee, 16 km (9.3 mi) east of Rosenheim.

The name of Prien is derived from the Celtic denomination of the river Prien (Brigenna, 'coming from the mountains').

Geography

Neighborhoods 
The political municipality of Prien am Chiemsee has 36 officially denominated neighborhoods:

Transport 
Prien is on the main rail line between Munich and Salzburg. Two branch lines originate at the Prien station. The Chiemgau Railway is a 10-km line extending into the foothills of the Alps at Aschau im Chiemgau; it is served by diesel multiple units. The Chiemsee-Bahn is a 2-km narrow-gauge steam-operated seasonal tourist line connecting the Prien station with Lake Chiem at Prien-Stock. From there boats operate to Herreninsel in the lake, on which is a royal palace built by King Ludwig II of Bavaria in the latter nineteenth century.

Bundesautobahn 8, which also connects Munich and Salzburg, can be reached a few kilometers south of the community on state road 2092.

Famous residents 
 Adolf von Bomhard (1891–1976) Lieutenant General in German army, mayor
 Klaus Kotter (born 1934) — president of the International Bobsleigh and Tobogganing Federation: 1980–1994.
 Maximilian Nicu (born 1982) — Bundesliga football player

Twin towns 

  Valdagno, Italy, since 1987

References

External links

Rosenheim (district)